The Coordinating Minister for Economic Policies is an appointment in the Cabinet of Singapore, initially introduced on 1 October 2015 to cover both economic and social policies. However, the social policy portfolio was dropped when the role was redesignated in 2019.

List of officeholders 
The Ministry is headed by the Prime Minister Office, who is appointed as part of the Cabinet of Singapore. The incumbent minister is Deputy Prime Minister Heng Swee Keat from the People's Action Party.

See also 
Coordinating Minister for Social Policies
Coordinating Minister for National Security
Minister-in-Charge of Muslim Affairs

References

2015 establishments in Singapore
Economic Policies